The 1st Winter Military World Games were held in Aosta Valley, Italy from March 20–25, 2010.

Medal table

Medal winners

Alpine skiing

Men

Women

Biathlon

Men

Women

Cross-country skiing

Men

Women

Climbing

Men

Women

Short track speed skating

Men

Women

Ski orienteering

Men

Women

See also
Military World Games

References

External links
CISM official website

Military World Games
Military World Games
Winter Military World Games
International sports competitions hosted by Italy
Multi-sport events in Italy
Winter Military World Games